SCANNING: The Journal of Scanning Microscopies is a peer-reviewed scientific journal covering all aspects of scanning microscopy, including scanning electron, scanning probe and scanning optical microscopies. Since 1 January 2017, Scanning become fully open access. It remains a Wiley journal, but is now published and hosted by the Hindawi Publishing Corporation.

References 

English-language journals
Bimonthly journals
Publications established in 1994
Wiley-Blackwell academic journals
Hindawi Publishing Corporation academic journals
Open access journals